In enzymology, a methylene-fatty-acyl-phospholipid synthase is an enzyme that catalyzes the chemical reaction

S-adenosyl-L-methionine + phospholipid olefinic fatty acid  S-adenosyl-L-homocysteine + phospholipid methylene fatty acid

Thus, the two substrates of this enzyme are S-adenosyl methionine and phospholipid olefinic fatty acid, whereas its two products are S-adenosylhomocysteine and phospholipid methylene fatty acid.

This enzyme belongs to the family of transferases, specifically those transferring one-carbon group methyltransferases.  The systematic name of this enzyme class is S-adenosyl-L-methionine:unsaturated-phospholipid methyltransferase (methenylating). This enzyme is also called unsaturated-phospholipid methyltransferase.

References

 

EC 2.1.1
Enzymes of unknown structure